The National Live Music Awards of 2018 are the third National Live Music Awards. The event took place on 6 December 2018. The event moved its gala event to Brisbane – following events in Sydney and Melbourne in the last two years.

The 2018 event introduced a new award for Best Live Music Photographer in Australia and a Hall of Fame equivalent, titled the Live Legends. Live Country or Folk Act was renamed to Live Country Act. The state based All Ages Achievement expanded to all states and territories, from only NSW and Victoria in 2017. The event was streamed live and for free via Netgigs.

Live Legends
 Magic Dirt

National awards
Nominations and wins below.

Live Act of the Year

Live Voice of the Year

Best New Act

Live Bassist of the Year

Live Drummer of the Year

Live Guitarist of the Year

Live Instrumentalist of the Year

Live Blues and Roots Act of the Year

Live Country Act of the Year

Live Electronic Act (or DJ) of the Year

Live Hard Rock Act of the Year

Live Hip Hop Act of the Year

Live Pop Act of the Year

Live R&B or Soul Act of the Year

Best Live Music Festival or Event

Best Live Photographer of the Year

International Live Achievement (Band)

International Live Achievement (Solo)

Industry Achievement

People's Choice awards
Best Live Act of the Year

Best Live Voice of the Year

State and Territory awards
Note: Wins only.

References

2018 in Australian music
2018 music awards
National Live Music Awards